Hol Idrettslag is a multi-sports club from Hol, Norway.

Established in 1903, it has sections for speed skating, skiing, football, cycling, athletics, orienteering and swimming. Well-known members include Ådne Søndrål, Håvard Bøkko, Christoffer Fagerli Rukke and Hege Bøkko, all of whom are speed skaters.

External links
Official site 

Sports teams in Norway
Speed skating clubs in Norway
Sports clubs established in 1903
Sport in Buskerud